Prince Said Ibrahim International Airport  (AIMPSI) is an international airport serving Moroni in Comoros. It is named after Prince Saïd Ibrahim. It is located north of the village of Hahaya.

Airlines and destinations

Notes
: Ethiopian Airlines's flight from Addis Ababa to Moroni stops in Dar es Salaam, but the airline does not have fifth freedom rights on the DAR – HAH sector.

: Turkish Airlines's flight from Moroni to Istanbul stops in Seychelles, but the airline does not have fifth freedom rights on the SEZ – HAH sector.

Accidents and incidents 
 On 23 November 1996, Ethiopian Airlines Flight 961, a Boeing 767-200ER flying from Addis Ababa to Abidjan with several stopovers was hijacked over Ethiopia by three Ethiopians seeking asylum in Australia. The plane crash-landed in the water three hours later when it ran out of fuel. 125 of the 175 passengers and crew were killed, including the three hijackers. The pilot's initial decision to land at the airport was thwarted due to the fuel starvation.
 On 30 June 2009, Yemenia Flight 626, flying from Yemen to Moroni crashed into the Indian Ocean while on final approach to the airport. 152 out of the 153 people on board were killed.
 On 27 November 2012 an Int'Air Îles Embraer EMB 120ER Brasilia (registration number D6-HUA) was underway from Moroni to Anjouan (both in Comoros Islands) on a charter flight with 25 passengers and 4 crew, when after taking off from Moroni's Prince Said Ibrahim International Airport it lost height, and while attempting to return to the airport, waterlanded 200 meters off the coast, about 5 km north of the airport. Local fishermen rescued everybody on board. There were only minor injuries.

References

External links

AIP Data
Airport chart

Airports in the Comoros
Buildings and structures in Moroni, Comoros